Ectonucleoside triphosphate diphosphohydrolase-1 (gene: ENTPD1; protein: NTPDase1) also known as CD39 (Cluster of Differentiation 39), is a typical cell surface enzyme with a catalytic site on the extracellular face.

Function 
NTPDase1 is an ectonucleotidase that catalyse the hydrolysis of γ- and β-phosphate residues of triphospho- and diphosphonucleosides to the monophosphonucleoside derivative.  NTPDase1 hydrolyzes P2 receptor ligands, namely ATP, ADP, UTP and UDP with similar efficacy.  NTPDase1 can therefore affect P2 receptor activation and functions.

Clinical significance
ATP causes a pro-inflammatory environment, whereas degradation of ATP into adenosine by the CD39/CD73 pathway leads to an anti-inflammatory environment. CD39 converts ATP (or ADP) to adenosine monophosphate (AMP), which is converted into adenosine by CD73. A substantial portion of the immune suppressive and anti-inflammatory activity of regulatory T cells (Tregs) is due to the adenosine produced by the CD39/CD73 pathway, insofar as Tregs express CD39 and CD73.

Adenosine produced by the CD39/CD73 pathway can protect against ischemia-reperfusion injury. On the other hand, high expression and activity of CD39 and CD73 on cancer cells can prevent the immune system from inhibiting the progression of cancer.

Biallelic pathogenic variant in ENTPD1 causes autosomal recessive spastic paraplegia 64 (SPG64). SPG64 is a complex hereditary spastic paraplegia characterized by childhood onset progressive spastic paraparesis, delayed developmental milestones, intellectual disability, dysarthria, and white matter abnormalities.

See also 
 Cluster of differentiation

References

Further reading

External links 
 

Clusters of differentiation